The Orenda/SP-26 Historic District, Chopawamsic RDA Camp 3, near Triangle, Virginia dates from 1934.  It was a Recreational Demonstration Area camp that includes work designed by the National Park Service and built by the Civilian Conservation Corps.  Building styles within the district include NPS rustic architecture.

It is located within what would become Prince William Forest Park;  it has also been known as Family Camp and Mothers & Tots' Camp.

When listed the historic district had 44 contributing buildings, 4 contributing structures and one contributing site.

See also
Chopawamsic RDA Camp 2, also NRHP-listed

References

Park buildings and structures on the National Register of Historic Places in Virginia
National Register of Historic Places in Prince William County, Virginia
Buildings and structures completed in 1934
Recreational Demonstration Areas
Historic districts on the National Register of Historic Places in Virginia
Prince William Forest Park
1934 establishments in Virginia
National Park Service rustic in Virginia